Scotch & Soul is the second album by piper and saxophonist Rufus Harley recorded in 1966 and released on the Atlantic label.

Reception

Allmusic awarded the album 4½ stars stating "The bagpipes tend to be a drone instrument and Harley cannot surmount the problem of cutting off notes quickly, but he plays his main instrument as well as anyone and is thus far the only jazz bagpipe player".

Track listing 
All compositions by Rufus Harley except as indicated
 "Feeling Good" (Leslie Bricusse, Anthony Newley) - 7:22
 "If You Could See Me Now" (Tadd Dameron, Carl Sigman) - 6:13
 "Taurus the 20th" - 6:56
 "Scotch & Soul" - 5:09
 "Passing the Cup" - 4:02
 "A Nightingale Sang in Berkeley Square" (Eric Maschwitz, Manning Sherwin) - 5:01
 "Sufur" - 4:48

Personnel 
Rufus Harley - bagpipes, flute, soprano saxophone, tenor saxophone
Oliver Collins - piano
James Glenn - bass
Billy Abner - drums
Robert Gosset - congas
Technical
Phil Iehle - recording

References 

1966 albums
Atlantic Records albums
Rufus Harley albums
Albums produced by Joel Dorn